Kendall Hinton  (born February 19, 1997) is an American football wide receiver for the Denver Broncos of the National Football League (NFL). He played college football at Wake Forest as a quarterback and wide receiver and signed with the Broncos as an undrafted free agent in 2020. That season he made an appearance as an emergency quarterback following the rest of the team's quarterbacks being placed in COVID-19 quarantine for a week. In doing so, Hinton became the first non-professional quarterback to play significant snaps at the position in an NFL game since running back Tom Matte with the Baltimore Colts in 1965.

High school career 
Hinton played quarterback at Southern Durham High School in Durham, North Carolina. As a high school junior, Hinton threw for 3,972 yards and 39 touchdowns en route to a 3–AA championship title.

College career 
Rated a three-star prospect by 247Sports and Rivals, Hinton committed to play college football at Wake Forest on June 11, 2014. As a true freshman in 2015, Hinton played in nine games and started in two of them. In the nine games, he threw for 929 yards and four touchdowns, while rushing for 390 yards and seven touchdowns. Against Army on September 19, Hinton replaced injured starting quarterback John Wolford in the first quarter of the game, and led the Demon Deacons to a 24–21 win by passing for 159 yards and two touchdowns. The next week against Indiana, Hinton made his first career start in place of Wolford, and had 245 yards passing along with 57 yards rushing and two touchdowns in the 31–24 loss. Hinton's 245 passing yards set a Wake Forest school record for most passing yards by a player in his first career start. He started again the following week against Florida State on October 3, throwing for 215 yards in a loss.

As a sophomore, Hinton suffered a sprained ankle in the Deacon Demons Week 3 game against Delaware. Initially expected to only miss 2–4 weeks, Hinton did not play for the remainder of the season and was granted a medical redshirt. As a redshirt sophomore, Hinton served as the primary backup quarterback to John Wolford in 2017, starting one game against Clemson in place of an injured Wolford. Hinton completed 14 of 30 passes for 203 yards and 2 touchdowns in the 28–14 loss.

As a junior he was projected to be the starting quarterback entering the season, Hinton was suspended for the first three games of the season for violating team rules. Following his return from suspension, Hinton was named the backup quarterback to true freshman Sam Hartman. Despite entering the transfer portal at the end of his redshirt junior year, Hinton opted to return to Wake Forest for his redshirt senior season. In his redshirt senior season, Hinton transitioned to playing slot receiver full-time, racking up 73 receptions for 1,001 yards and four touchdowns.

Professional career 

Hinton signed with the Denver Broncos as an undrafted free agent on April 26, 2020. He was waived on September 5, 2020, but re-signed with their practice squad on November 4, 2020. In late November 2020, all four Broncos quarterbacks were ruled ineligible to play in a Week 12 game against the New Orleans Saints due to COVID-19 pandemic protocols, so Hinton was elevated to the active roster as an emergency quarterback option for the team, as his time as a quarterback at Wake Forest made him the only player on the Broncos’ roster who had experience at the position. 

He subsequently completed only a single 13-yard pass to tight end Noah Fant out of nine attempts, while also recording two interceptions as the Broncos lost 31–3. He became the first non-quarterback to play significant snaps at the position in an NFL game since running back Tom Matte with the Baltimore Colts in 1965. Hinton reverted to the practice squad following the game, and signed a reserve/futures contract with the team on January 4, 2021.

On August 31, 2021, Hinton was waived by the Broncos and re-signed to the practice squad the next day. He was promoted to the active roster on September 14, 2021. Against the Pittsburgh Steelers, Hinton caught his first career touchdown pass in the 27–19 loss.

On August 30, 2022, Hinton was waived by the Broncos and signed to the practice squad the next day. He was promoted to the active roster on September 17 for the Broncos' Week 2 game against the Houston Texans, in which he caught one pass for 20 yards en route to a 16–9 win. On September 19, he reverted back to the practice squad. On September 24, he was once again elevated to the active roster for the Broncos' Week 3 game against the San Francisco 49ers, in which he recorded one reception for 27 yards in an 11–10 win. He was signed to the active roster on October 10.

NFL career statistics

References

External links 
Denver Broncos bio
Wake Forest Demon Deacons bio

1997 births
Living people
American football quarterbacks
American football wide receivers
Denver Broncos players
Players of American football from North Carolina
Sportspeople from Durham, North Carolina
Wake Forest Demon Deacons football players
African-American players of American football
21st-century African-American sportspeople